Hertford and Stortford is a constituency currently represented in the House of Commons of the UK Parliament by  Julie Marson of the Conservative Party.

Description 
The constituency is semi-rural which includes picturesque villages and farmland separating the county town of Hertford, population 25,000. The rivers Rib, Beane, Mimram, and Lea all meet in Hertford, which is protected from over development by Green Belt land which encircles the town separating it from its neighbour Ware (17,000) in the western part of the constituency. Farms continue between Ware and the ancient market town of Bishop's Stortford with a population of more than 32,000 people in the north east corner of the seat. Bishop's Stortford has developed into a popular area for commuters, with rail links to London's Liverpool Street station. Thorley on the south side of Stortford, contains a huge residential estate of owner occupied houses built mainly in the 1980s.

The constituency is affluent, having a majority of professional and managerial workers as it is within commuting distance of London. Stansted Airport, which lies just outside the seat's eastern perimeter has been responsible for bringing jobs and an improved train service to the constituency. The pharmaceutical industry is also an important provider of jobs - GlaxoSmithKline has facilities in Ware and nearby Harlow, and Merck was based until recently at Gilston on the seat's southern border. London is within commuting distance with trains to the City running from all the towns in the constituency.

Boundaries and boundary changes

1983–1997: The District of East Hertfordshire wards of Bishop's Stortford Central, Bishop's Stortford Chantry, Bishop's Stortford Parsonage, Bishop's Stortford Thorley, Braughing, Buntingford, Hertford Bengeo, Hertford Castle, Hertford Kingsmead, Hertford Sele, Hunsdon, Little Hadham, Much Hadham, Sawbridgeworth, Standon St Mary, Stapleford, Tewin, Thundridge, Ware Christchurch, Ware Priory, Ware St Mary's, and Ware Trinity.

New County Constituency including Hertford and Ware, previously part of the abolished County Constituency of Hertford and Stevenage, and Bishop's Stortford and Sawbridgeworth together with rural areas to the west, previously part of the abolished County Constituency of East Hertfordshire.

1997–2010: The District of East Hertfordshire wards of Bishop's Stortford Central, Bishop's Stortford Chantry, Bishop's Stortford Parsonage, Bishop's Stortford Thorley, Great Amwell, Hertford Bengeo, Hertford Castle, Hertford Kingsmead, Hertford Sele, Hunsdon, Little Amwell, Much Hadham, Sawbridgeworth, Stanstead, Ware Christchurch, Ware Priory, Ware St Mary's, and Ware Trinity.

Stanstead Abbotts and Great Amwell transferred from Broxbourne.  Northern, rural areas transferred to the new County Constituency of North East Hertfordshire.

2010–present: The District of East Hertfordshire wards of Bishop's Stortford All Saints, Bishop's Stortford Central, Bishop's Stortford Meads, Bishop's Stortford Silverleys, Bishop's Stortford South, Great Amwell, Hertford Bengeo, Hertford Castle, Hertford Heath, Hertford Kingsmead, Hertford Sele, Hunsdon, Much Hadham, Sawbridgeworth, Stanstead Abbots, Ware Chadwell, Ware Christchurch, Ware St Mary's, and Ware Trinity.

Marginal changes due to revision of local authority wards.

Members of Parliament

Elections

Elections in the 2010s

Elections in the 2000s

Elections in the 1990s

Elections in the 1980s

See also
 List of parliamentary constituencies in Hertfordshire

Notes

References

Parliamentary constituencies in Hertfordshire
Constituencies of the Parliament of the United Kingdom established in 1983
Politics of East Hertfordshire District
Hertford